Life Is for Living may refer to

 Life... Is for Living, an album by Sherbet
 "Life Is for Living", a song by Coldplay from Parachutes
 "Life Is for Living", a song by Barclay James Harvest
 Vazhkai Vazhvatharke, an Indian film known in English as Life Is for Living